Richard E. Rubenstein (born February 24, 1938) is an author and University Professor of Conflict Resolution and Public Affairs at George Mason University, holding degrees from Harvard University, Oxford University (as a Rhodes Scholar), and Harvard Law School. Rubenstein is from Woodmere, New York. He lives in Washington, D.C.

Career 
Rubenstein was an attorney at Steptoe & Johnson in Washington, DC, and served as assistant director of the Adlai Stevenson Institute of International Affairs in Chicago before becoming associate professor of political science at Roosevelt University (1970–79), professor of law and academic dean at Antioch Law School (1979–87), and university professor at George Mason University (since 1987). He is a faculty member and former director of George Mason's Jimmy and Rosalynn Carter School for Peace and Conflict Resolution, the nation's oldest and largest conflict studies program.

Since the 1970s Rubenstein has been active in movements for peace, racial equality, and social justice. In Chicago he helped organize protests against the Vietnam War and activities in support of the Black Power movement. His writings have mostly been about various types of violent conflicts and the possibilities of resolving them by restructuring failing socioeconomic, cultural, and political systems.

His first book, "Rebels in Eden: Mass Violence in the United States," (Little Brown, 1970) was an attempt to understand the racial uprisings of the sixties in the context of the history of struggles for group autonomy in America. This was followed by "Left Turn: Origins of the Next American Revolution," (Little Brown, 1973), an interpretation of U.S. politics in light of America's "three class" social system. After coming to Washington, Rubenstein wrote two books on terrorism: "Alchemists of Revolution," (Basic Books, 1986), a Marxist take on the origins and dynamics of terrorism movements, and "Comrade Valentine" (Harcourt Books, 1993), a meditation on the life of Yevno Azef, the notorious double agent who terrorized Russian society in the decade before the Russian Revolution.

Beginning in the late 90s, Rubenstein turned his attention to religious conflict and wrote three books showing why religious disputes become (or don't become) violent. "When Jesus Became God" (Harcourt, 1999), is a best-selling account of the controversy over Christ's divinity in early Christianity. "Aristotle's Children" (Harcourt, 2003), is the story of how the medieval Catholic Church allowed its thinking to be transformed by the great debate over Aristotelian philosophy. And "Thus Saith the Lord: The Revolutionary Moral Vision of Isaiah and Jeremiah" (Harcourt, 2006), tells how the later Jewish prophets were inspired to develop a new vision of international ethics by reacting to the empires of their day. 

In 2010 Rubenstein's book, Reasons to Kill: Why Americans Choose War" was published by Bloomsbury Press. This study describes the arguments and images used to convince Americans that wars are justified by the values of their "civil religion." His latest books are "Resolving Structural Conflicts: How Violent Systems Can Be Transformed" (Routledge, 2017), and "Conflict Resolution After the Pandemic: Building Peace, Pursuing Justice," an edited work (with Solon Simmons) published by Routledge in 2021. Rubenstein's blog, www.rich-rubenstein.com, contains material about conflict analysis and resolution generally and articles written for online journals such as CounterPunch and Transcend Media Service.

Selected works
  Rebels in Eden: Mass Political Violence in America.  Little, Brown.  1970. (Also published in the UK).
  Left Turn: Origins of the Next American Revolution. Little, Brown.  1973. (Also published in the UK).
  Alchemists of Revolution: Terrorism in the Modern World. Basic Books. 1987. .
  Comrade Valentine: The True Story of Azef the Spy. Harcourt. 1994. . (Also published in Poland).
  When Jesus Became God: The Struggle to Define Christianity During the Last Days of Rome. Harcourt. 2000. (Also published in France, Brazil, Mexico, Korea, and Japan).
  Aristotle's Children: How Christians, Muslims, and Jews Rediscovered Ancient Wisdom and Illuminated the Middle Ages. Harcourt. 2003. . (Also published in Brazil, Mexico, Korea, Japan, Nationalist China, and Greece).
  Thus Saith the Lord: The Revolutionary Moral Vision of Isaiah and Jeremiah.  Harcourt. 2006. 
 Reasons to Kill: Why Americans Choose War. Bloomsbury Press. 2010.

References

External links
Faculty page at George Mason University
Rich Rubenstein's Blog
Jimmy and Rosalynn Carter School for Peace and Conflict Resolution

American medievalists
1938 births
Harvard Law School alumni
George Mason University faculty
Living people
20th-century American Jews
Harvard College alumni
American Rhodes Scholars
Alumni of the University of Oxford
21st-century American Jews